Craig Cywarch is an extensive crag looming above Cwm Cywarch. The nearest village is Dinas Mawddwy on the A470.

Climbing routes on the various buttresses range from E2 to V Diff. Access paths can be rather overgrown and even finding the bottom of the routes can be rather difficult.

See also 

 Aran Fawddwy

References 

 Paul Williams, Rock Climbing in Snowdonia

External links 
www.geograph.co.uk : photos of Craig Cywarch and surrounding area
 http://www.geologywales.co.uk/storms/winter0405c.htm

Mawddwy
Mountains and hills of Gwynedd
Mountains and hills of Snowdonia